Tethystola obliqua is a species of beetle in the family Cerambycidae. It was described by Thomson in 1868. It is known from Venezuela.

References

Apomecynini
Beetles described in 1868